Johann Helfrich von Müller (January 16, 1746 in Kleve – 1830) was an engineer in the Hessian army who conceived the difference engine in 1786 (first written reference to the basic principles of a difference machine is dated to 1784), an idea that later evolved into modern computers. In 1784, he was responsible for an improved adding machine based on principles of Leibniz's stepped reckoner.

Müller was demonstrably the first who came up with the idea of calculating mathematical tables automatically by a machine. To achieve this, he planned building a printing differential engine. However, this plan was not realized.

References
Biography of Johann Helfrich Müller, with information on his calculating machines
d'Ocagne, Maurice (1905). Le Calcul Simplifié Par Les Procedes Mecaniques Et Graphiques. Google Book Search. Retrieved on April 23, 2008.
Dr Stefano Zottino ANALYTICAL ENGINE L'IDEA INNOVATIVA DI CHARLES BABBAGE, Thesis, Università Ca' Foscari di Venezia, Italy.
Krause, Christine: Das Positive von Differenzen Die Rechenmaschinen von Müller, Babbage, Scheutz, Wiberg, ...  

Engineers from Hesse
1746 births
1830 deaths
People from Kleve